The  is a museum in Naka-ku, Yokohama, Kanagawa Prefecture, Japan, dedicated to maritime security and the Japan Coast Guard. It opened on 10 December 2004.

Exhibits
The centrepiece of the museum is a North Korean spy vessel, which was sunk by the Japan Coast Guard in December 2001 following a firefight in the East China Sea near the island of Amami-Ōshima. (See Battle of Amami-Ōshima.)

See also
 NYK Maritime Museum, in Yokohama
 Japan Coast Guard Museum, in Kure, Hiroshima Prefecture

References

External links

  

Naka-ku, Yokohama
Museums in Yokohama
Maritime museums in Japan
Museums established in 2004
2004 establishments in Japan
Japan Coast Guard
Coast guard history